Pyman is a surname. Notable people with this surname include:

 Avril Pyman (born 1930), British scholar and translator
 Frank Lee Pyman (1882–1944), English academic
 George Pyman (1822–1900), British shipping magnate
 Harold Pyman (1908–1971), British army officer
 Iain Pyman (born 1973), English golfer
 Richard Pyman (born 1968), English cricket player
 Robert Pyman (born 1971), Australian Australian rules football player
 Sydney Pyman Bell (1875–1944), English rugby union player and solicitor
 Trevor Pyman (1916–1995), Australian diplomat